Elachista crocospila is a moth of the family Elachistidae. It is found in Australia in south-eastern New South Wales.

The wingspan is 6.6-6.9 mm for males and 7.1-7.8 mm for females. The forewings are blue in males and black with a bronzy sheen and three yellow markings in females. The hindwings are dark grey in both sexes.

The larvae feed on Carex brunnea. They mine the leaves of their host plant. The mine is white and reaches a length of about 100 mm. The frass is deposited in a dense block in the upper part of the mine. Pupation takes place outside of the mine, along the midrib of a leaf of the host plant.

References

Moths described in 2011
crocospila
Moths of Australia
Taxa named by Lauri Kaila